The 2017 U Sports Men's Final 8 Basketball Tournament was held March 9–12, 2017 in Halifax, Nova Scotia. It was hosted by Dalhousie University at the Scotiabank Centre, the first time since 1987 that Dalhousie hosted the tournament.

The Carleton Ravens won their seventh straight title, their 13th in 15 years, this time over the Ryerson Rams, who came into the tournament ranked number one in the country. The Dalhousie Tigers took their first ever bronze medal by defeating the McGill Redmen. Carleton extended its record number of men's national basketball championships, more than any top division college in Canada or the United States.

All tournament games were shown live online via the U Sports website (using Stretch Internet). The semi-final and final games were on television's Sportsnet 360 and on its online service.

This marked the first Men's Final 8 branded as a U Sports championship.

Participating Teams

Championship Bracket
* – Denotes overtime period

Consolation Bracket

See also 
2017 U Sports Women's Basketball Championship

References 

2016–17 in Canadian basketball
2017 in Nova Scotia
U Sports Men's Basketball Championship